Tassone is a surname. Notable people with the surname include:

 Mario Tassone (born 1943), Italian politician and lawyer
 Paul Tassone (born 1969), Australian actor

See also
 Tassoni

Italian-language surnames